Country Code: +504
International Call Prefix: 00

National Significant Numbers (NSN): eight digits.

Format: +504 2ABC XXXX (fixed lines)
or +504 YABC XXXX for Y = 3,7,8,9 (mobile)

Number plan

In 2010 fixed telephone numbers in Honduras increased from seven to eight digits by adding the digit 2 at the beginning of all fixed line numbers.

Changes in 2007
Mobile telephone numbers in Honduras increased from seven (7) to eight (8) digits. The new dialling instructions are as follows:
Dial 9 + seven-digit number for calls placed to subscribers of Celtel (Tigo)
Dial 8 + seven-digit number for calls placed to subscribers of Digicel Honduras
Dial 7 + seven-digit number for calls placed to subscribers of Hondutel
Dial 3 + seven-digit number for calls placed to subscribers of Sercom (Claro)

Fixed numbers in Honduras remained unchanged at seven digits in length until 2010.

See also 
 Telecommunications in Honduras

References

Honduras
Communications in Honduras